Betty Howe (May 23, 1895 – June 21, 1969) was an American actress in silent films.

Early life 
Howe was born in New York City, and attended Chappaqua Mountain Institute, a Quaker school.

Career 
With "no stage experience," Howe joined Vitagraph Studios as a stock player in 1916. In 1918, she and Canadian actor Edward Earle formed the Earle-Howe production company within Vitagraph. She appeared in silent films, including Mr. Jack, a Hallroom Hero (1916, short), Mr. Jack Trifles (1916, short), Mr. Jack Hires a Stenographer (1916, short), Fathers of Men (1916), The Alibi (1916), Beatrice Fairfax (1916, serial), The Scarlet Runner (1916), For France (1917), The Blind Adventure (1918), The Lie (1918), To Hell with the Kaiser! (1918), Wolves of Kultur (1918), As a Man Thinks (1919), The Woman of His Dream (1921), A Man of Stone (1921), and Breaking Home Ties (1922).

Personal life 
Howe died in New York City in 1969, aged 74 years.

References

External links 
 
 Full-length studio publicity portrait of actor Betty Howe posed holding ostrich plumes behind her head, circa 1915; photograph at Getty Images.

American silent film actresses
20th-century American actresses
1895 births
1969 deaths